Lyndon Henry Arthur Harrison, Baron Harrison (born 28 September 1947) is a British Labour Party politician.

Early life
Harrison was born on 28 September 1947, to Charles and Edith Harrison. He was educated at the City of Oxford High School for Boys, a state school in Oxford, Oxfordshire. He then attended the University of Warwick, graduating in 1970 with a Bachelor of Arts (BA) degree in English and American studies. He continued his studies at the University of Sussex where he completed a Master of Arts (MA) degree in American studies in 1971.

Political career
He was a Labour Party local councillor from 1981 to 1990, serving on Cheshire County Council. He was Member of the European Parliament (MEP) from 1989 to 1999, representing the Cheshire West constituency.

He was created a life peer on 28 July 1999 taking the title Baron Harrison, of Chester in the County of Cheshire. Lord Harrison spoke regularly in the House of Lords until his retirement on 11 July 2022.

Personal life
Harrison is a Humanist. He is a member of the All Party Parliamentary Humanist Group and a Distinguished Supporter of Humanists UK. He is also an honorary associate of the National Secular Society.

References

Sources
 http://biographies.parliament.uk/parliament/default.asp?id=26907
 http://hansard.millbanksystems.com/people/mr-lyndon-harrison
 http://www.eurosource.eu.com/engine.asp?lev1=4&lev2=38&menu=98&biog=y&id=26907&group=5&Page=Lord%20Harrison%20:%20Political%20Biography
 The Independent

1947 births
Living people
Labour Party (UK) life peers
British humanists
MEPs for England 1989–1994
MEPs for England 1994–1999
People educated at the City of Oxford High School for Boys
Life peers created by Elizabeth II